KIKC (1250 kHz) is an AM radio station broadcasting a classic country format. Licensed to Forsyth, Montana, United States, the station is currently owned by The Marks Group.

History
KIKC began broadcasting October 10, 1975, airing a country music format, and was owned by Gold Won Radio Corporation. The station ran 5,000 watts, and operated during daytime hours only. In 1986, its sister station 101.3 KXXE's call sign was changed to KIKC-FM, and it began simulcasting the programming of KIKC. In 1987, the station was sold to NEPSK Inc., along with its FM sister station, for $252,500. In 1996, the stations were sold to Stephen Marks for $300,000. In June 2001, the station adopted an oldies format. On February 1, 2009 KIKC-AM changed their format from oldies to classic country.

References

External links
KIKC AM/FM Online

IKC
Classic country radio stations in the United States
Radio stations established in 1975
1975 establishments in Montana